The Scott Wike Lucas Bridge is a bridge located in the community of Havana, Illinois. It carries U.S. Route 136 over the Illinois River. Named after a former politician, it was constructed in 1936 and reconstructed over 60 years later.

References

Bridges completed in 1936
Buildings and structures in Mason County, Illinois
Bridges over the Illinois River